Branka Vukičević (born 21 February 1982) is a Croatian female professional basketball player.

External links
Profile at eurobasket.com

1982 births
Living people
Basketball players from Šibenik
Croatian women's basketball players
Point guards
Shooting guards
ŽKK Gospić players